The 14th Grand Prix de Rouen-les-Essarts, was the third round of the 1966 Trophées de France. It was held on the Circuit de Rouen-les-Essarts, in Grand-Couronne, near Rouen, on the 10 July.
This Formula Two race was only a week after the previous round at Reims, and the cars were brought over from there and assembled in time for opening qualifying on the Thursday. Qualifying was scheduled for Thursday and Friday. This allowed those drivers competing in the Martini Trophy race at Slverstone to practise and then fly to England for the sportscar race and return to Northern France in time for the race on Sunday.

Report

Entry
A total of 26 F2 cars were entered for the event, of which 22 took part in qualifying. Of those 22, plenty of big names turned out. The championship leaders, Jack Brabham and Denny Hulme arrived with their Honda S100–powered Brabhams, hoping to continue their good form, as Brabham had won the two previous races at Pau and Reims. Roy Winkelmann brought two Cosworth-powered Brabhams for Jochen Rindt and Alan Rees, while John Surtees, Jacky Ickx, Graham Hill and Jean-Pierre Beltoise were scheduled to drive Matra-BRMs, although Surtees’ car was fitted with a Cosworth engine.

Qualifying
Thursday’s qualifying session was uneventful, with most teams trying to sort their cars for the weekend ahead. Jack Brabham turned in the fastest lap, timed at 2min 14.9, Jochen Rindt managed a 2:15.8 lap. Denny Hulme was unable to record a time below 2:16, while of the rest of field could not better 2:17.

Friday’s session was very different, with everyone trying to set a competitive time. Nevertheless, Brabham’s pole time of 2min 10.7 (averaging a speed of 112.018 mph) was a full two seconds quicker than his team-mate Hulme, and nearly 4½ seconds ahead of everyone else. Third was claimed by Jochen Rindt, in a time of 2:15.1, with half a second covering the next four drivers; John Surtees, Graham Hill, Jean-Pierre Beltoise and Richard Attwood.
Saturday’s Martini Trophy race at Silverstone, saw Denny Hulme victorious.

Race
On the Sunday, the Grand Prix de Rouen-les-Essarts was held over 46 laps of the Circuit de Rouen-les-Essarts.

Jochen Rindt got the jump, when the flag dropped, over the dominant Brabham-Hondas, leading into the first corner. However, by the Virage du Nouveau Monda (turn four), Jack Brabham was past and opened a three-second lead by the end of lap one. Rindt was second, following by Jean-Pierre Beltoise, Graham Hill, Alan Rees and Richard Attwood.

Meanwhile, back in ninth place was Denny Hulme. Although Brabham was pulling away at a rate of three seconds a lap, Hulme had passed everyone bar his team leader by lap 4, ahead of John Surtees, Beltoise, Rees and Rindt.

While the Brabham-Hondas headed off into the distance, Rindt made his way back to third, then pulled away from his pursuers. On lap 14, Brabham set the fastest lap of the race, with a 2m 14.6 lap. By this stage, Hulme was 3s behind and a gap of 15s to Rindt.

By half distance (lap 23), only ten cars remained on the lead lap. Rindt’s excellent drive came to an end, when his gearbox failed, while the Brabham pairing steamed on relentlessly. Then Rees held third, and immediately set about closing the gap to Hulme, halving the gap from 45s to 23s. Hulme’s car began sounding rough, and just six laps from the end of the race, Brabham stopped on the circuit with a broken gearlever, robbing him of a comfortable third straight Trophées de France win.

Hulme reeled off the remaining laps to secure his first Trophées de France win for two years, with Rees finishing second, 15s behind. Following mechanical problems to many of the cars, Pedro Rodríguez inherited third. Kurt Ahrens Jr. managed to claim fourth place from Hill, just a few corners from home, Hill finished fifth with Trevor Blokdyk sixth.

Denny Hulme took the winner's spoils for the works Brabham team, driving their Brabham-Honda BT18. Hulme won in a time of 1hr 46:33.5mins., averaging a speed of 105.313 mph.

Classification

Race result

 Fastest lap: Jack Brabham, 2:14.6ecs. (105.772 mph)

References

1966 in motorsport
Trophées de France
Grand Prix de Rouen-les-Essarts